Estonian Literary Society (abbreviated EKS) is Estonian organization which aims are to popularize literature and literary science related to Estonia, and also to enhance cooperation between Estonian organizations and institutions related to literature.

EKS was founded in 1907.

EKS is associated with Estonian Academy of Sciences.

See also
Estonian Writers' Union

References

Further reading
 "Eesti Kirjanduse Selts: 1907–1932". Compiled by August Palm. Tartu, EKS, 1932, 94 pp
 August Palm, "Friedebert Tuglas ja Eesti Kirjanduse Selts" – Looming 1966, nr 2, pp 297–310
 Valik August Palmi ja Friedebert Tuglase kirju. Compiled Merike Kiipus – Keel ja Kirjandus 2002, nr 2, lk 124–131
 Akadeemia, 2007, nr 11, articles: Johan Kõpp, "Eesti Kirjanduse Seltsi asutamise lugu"; Julius Mägiste, "Eesti Kirjanduse Selts"; Herman Evert, "Eesti Kirjanduse Selts 1940. aastast edasi" 
 Marin Laak, Krista Ojasaar, "Sada aastat ajalugu: Eesti Kirjanduse Selts 1907–2007". EKS, Tartu, 2007, 48 pp

Estonian literature
1907 establishments in Estonia
Writers' organizations by country